Changes in matter may refer to:
Chemical changes in matter
Physical changes in matter